Joe Young may refer to:
Joe Young (lyricist) (1889–1939), American lyricist
Joe Young (politician) (born c. 1947), Canadian communist politician
Joe Young (defensive end) (1933–2019), American football player
Joe Young (basketball) (born 1992), American basketball player
Joe Young (MLB 2K), a fictional baseball player used in the MLB 2K series of video games as a replacement for Barry Bonds
Joe Young (safety) (born 1988), American football safety
Joe Young (horse), award-winning Standardbred harness racing trotter

See also
Joseph Young (disambiguation)
Mighty Joe Young (disambiguation)